Fourth Lake is a lake that is located by Fourth Lake, New York. Fish species present in the lake are northern pike, smallmouth bass, largemouth bass, bluegill, yellow perch, pumpkinseed sunfish, and brown bullhead. There is a state owned carry down located north of the hamlet of Fourth Lake on the west shore.

References

Lakes of New York (state)
Lakes of Warren County, New York